The subgenus Kerteszia are Neotropical anopheline mosquitoes originally described in 1905 by Frederick V. Theobald as genus Kertészia with Kertészia boliviensis as the type species.

Bionomics

Subgenus Kerteszia immatures develop primarily in the water in bromeliads, and less often in bamboo. They are distributed southward from the State of Veracruz in Mexico through Central America and Atlantic South America, along the coast to Misiones Province in Argentina and Rio Grande do Sul in Brazil, and on the Pacific coast of South America to El Oro Province, Ecuador. The subgenus is absent from the West Indies islands except Trinidad and from most of the Amazon basin in South America.

Medical Importance

Several species of this subgenus are important primary vectors of human malarias, and other species are suspected vectors.

Species

Species listed by the Walter Reed Biosystematics Unit:
 Anopheles (Kerteszia) auyantepuiensis Harbach and Navarro
 Anopheles (Kerteszia) bambusicolus Komp
 Anopheles (Kerteszia) bellator Dyar and Knab (syn.: Anopheles (Kerteszia) bromelicola Dyar)
 Anopheles (Kerteszia) boliviensis (Theobald)
 Anopheles (Kerteszia) cruzii Dyar and Knab (syn.: Anopheles (Kerteszia) adolphoi Neiva, Anopheles (Kerteszia) lutzii Theobald, Anopheles (Kerteszia) montemor Correa)
 Anopheles (Kerteszia) gonzalezrinconesi Cova García, Pulido F. & Escalante de Ugueto
 Anopheles (Kerteszia) homunculus Komp (syn.: Anopheles (Kerteszia) anoplus Komp)
 Anopheles (Kerteszia) laneanus Corrêa & Cerqueira
 Anopheles (Kerteszia) lepidotus Zavortink
 Anopheles (Kerteszia) neivai Howard, Dyar and Knab (syn.: Anopheles (Kerteszia) hylephilus Dyar and Knab)
 Anopheles (Kerteszia) pholidotus Zavortink
 Anopheles (Kerteszia) rollai Cova García, Pulido F. & Escalante de Ugueto (syn.: Anopheles (Kerteszia) hilli Cova Garcia, Pulido and de Ugueto)

References

Anopheles
Insect vectors of human pathogens
Taxa named by Frederick Vincent Theobald
Insect subgenera